Zubab Rana is a Pakistani television actress. She is known for her role as Aleena in Mere Khudaya and as Hania in Bandish, the former of which earned her a nomination for Best Emerging Talent at Lux Style Awards. She lost her father Rana Matbool Hussain in August 2021 at Lahore due to COVID19.

Career
Rana made her acting debut with a role in Hum TV series Naseebo Jali (2017).  She further appeared as an antagonist in social series Mere Khudaya (2018) and as a protagonist in horror series Bandish (2019). For her performance as Aleena (antagonist) in Mere Khudaya, she received a nomination for Best Emerging Talent at the 18th Lux Style Awards.

In April 2022, Actress Zubab Rana is receiving backlash  on social media for a statement that some find to be offensive.

Filmography

Television

Anthology Series

Short Film

Music video

Awards and nominations

References

External links

21st-century Pakistani actresses
Living people
Pakistani television actresses
Year of birth missing (living people)